Tharrawaddy or Thayarwady District is a district of the Bago Division in central Burma (Myanmar). The capital lies at Tharrawaddy, Burma.

Townships
The district contains the following townships:
Tharrawaddy Township
Letpadan Township
Minhla Township
Monyo Township
Okpho Township
Gyobingauk Township
Zigon Township
Nattalin Township

Further reading
 

 
Districts of Myanmar
Bago Region